Gazir (also Romanized as Gāzīr; also known as Gāzūr) is a village in the Central District of Sareyn County, Ardabil Province, Iran. At the 2006 census, its population was 160 in 38 families.

References 

Tageo

Towns and villages in Sareyn County